Abantis meneliki is a butterfly in the family Hesperiidae. It is found in Ethiopia, Somalia and Djibouti.

References

Butterflies described in 1979
Tagiadini